Walker Books is a British publisher of children's books, founded in 1978 by Sebastian Walker, Amelia Edwards, and Wendy Boase.

In 1991, the success of Walker Books' Where's Wally? series enabled the company to expand into the American market, starting a sister company called Candlewick Press in 1991. In 1993, Walker Books also entered the Australian market by establishing another sister company, called Walker Books Australia.

In 2001, co-founder of Walker Books Amelia Edwards won the Eleanor Farjeon Award for her contributions to children's literature as the publisher's art director.

The company's logo of a bear holding a candle was designed by Helen Oxenbury.

The company have supported Bliss, the special care baby charity, since 2008.

In May 2020, the company was acquired by Trustbridge Global Media, together with its sister company in the US Candlewick Press and its other subsidiary in Australia.

References

External links
Official site

Children's book publishers
Book publishing companies of the United Kingdom
Publishing companies established in 1978
1978 establishments in England